FC Naftan Novopolotsk (FK Naftan Navapolatsk) is a Belarusian football club based in Novopolotsk. They play in the Belarusian First League, the second division in Belarusian football. Their home stadium is Atlant Stadium.

History

Name changes 
1963: Formed as Neftyanik Novopolotsk
1981: Renamed Dvina Novopolotsk
1989: Renamed Kommunalnik Novopolotsk
1992: Renamed Naftan Novopolotsk
1995: Renamed Naftan-Devon Novopolotsk
2001: Renamed Naftan Novopolotsk

Achievements 
Belarusian Cup
 Winners (2): 2009, 2012

Current squad 
As of March 2023

League and Cup history

Naftan in European Cups

Managers 
 Vasily Zaitsev (Jan 1, 2004 – May 27, 2004)
 Vyacheslav Akshaev (May 27, 2004 – May 13, 2007)
 Igor Kovalevich (May 14, 2007 – Dec 12, 2012)
 Pavel Kucherov (Dec 27, 2012 – June 20, 2013)
 Valery Strypeykis (June 21, 2013 – Aug 23, 2016)
 Oleg Sidorenkov (Aug 24, 2016–)

See also 
 Naftan Oil Refinery

References

External links 
Official Website

 
1963 establishments in Belarus
Football clubs in Belarus
Vitebsk Region
Association football clubs established in 1963